is a Japanese football player. He plays for Arterivo Wakayama.

Club statistics
Updated to 18 November 2018.

References

External links

Profile at Nara Club
J. League (#27)

1989 births
Living people
Doshisha University alumni
Association football people from Hokkaido
Japanese footballers
J2 League players
Japan Football League players
Gainare Tottori players
Nara Club players
Arterivo Wakayama players
Association football defenders